James Louis Terry (ג'יימס טרי; born November 26, 1960) is an American-Israeli former basketball player. He played the center position. He played in the Israeli Premier League between 1983 and 1996.

Biography

Terry was born in Cleveland, Ohio. He is 6' 11" (211 cm) tall, and weighs 220 pounds.

He attended Howard University ('82), and played basketball for the Howard Bison from 1978 to 1982. In 2016, Terry was inducted into the Howard University Athletic Hall of Fame.

Terry was drafted in the 1982 NBA Draft in Round 9, Pick 196, by the Washington Wizards.

In 1982, Terry played 44 games for the Maine Lumberjacks in the Continental Basketball Association. That year he converted to Judaism. He later became an Israeli citizen, and served in the Israeli Defense Forces.

Terry played in the Israeli Basketball Premier League between 1983 and 1996, for Maccabi Haifa, Hapoel Holon, Hapoel Tel Aviv, Ironi Nahariya, and Hapoel Eilat, in Spain for Saski Baskonia, and in Italy for Stefanel Trieste.

In 2007, after retiring from basketball, Terry was working as a construction supervisor.

References 

Living people
Israeli men's basketball players
Hapoel Holon players
Hapoel Tel Aviv B.C. players
Hapoel Eilat basketball players
Howard Bison men's basketball players
American expatriate basketball people in Israel
American expatriate basketball people in Spain
American expatriate basketball people in Italy
Pallacanestro Trieste players
People from Cleveland
1960 births
Centers (basketball)
American men's basketball players
Maccabi Haifa B.C. players
Ironi Nahariya players
Maine Lumberjacks players
Washington Wizards draft picks
Saski Baskonia players
Israeli American
Jewish men's basketball players
20th-century American Jews
Israeli Jews
Converts to Judaism
21st-century American Jews